Gachechiladze is a Georgian surname. Notable people with the surname include:
Givi Gachechiladze (born 1938), Georgian composer and conductor
Levan Gachechiladze (born 1964), Georgian politician and businessman 
Mikheil Gachechiladze (born 1990), Georgian rugby union player
Shalva Gachechiladze (born 1987), Georgian show jumping champion
Tamara Gachechiladze (born 1983), Georgian singer, songwriter, and actress

Surnames of Georgian origin
Georgian-language surnames